Reel Bad Arabs: How Hollywood Vilifies a People is a documentary film directed by Sut Jhally and produced by Media Education Foundation in 2006. This film is an extension of the book of the same name by Jack Shaheen, which also analyzes how Hollywood corrupts or manipulates the image of Arabs. The documentary analyzes 1,000 films that have Arab and Muslim characters, produced between 1896 to 2000, out of which great majority, 936 titles, were negative in their portrayal, arguing that the slander of Arabs in American filmmaking has existed since the early days of the silent cinema and is present in the biggest Hollywood blockbusters today. Jack Shaheen analyzes a long series of "demeaning" images of Arabs through his presentation of various scenes from different American movies which he has studied. He argues that this image is characterized by showing Arabs either as bandits or as a savage, nomadic race, or shows Arab women as shallow belly dancers serving evil, naïve, and greedy Arab sheiks. Most important is the image of the rifle in the hands of Arab "terrorists". The film then attempts to explain the motivations behind these stereotypes about Arabs, and their development at key points in American history, as well as why it is so important today.

The film showed for the first time in Washington on 8 June 2007 and then in Los Angeles in the 20 June 2007. The run time of the film is 50 minutes, with Arabic and English subtitles. Soon afterward, the film was shown successively in more than a dozen of international film festivals between 2006 and 2009  The film's estimated budget is $100,000.

Synopsis
Shaheen speaks at the beginning of the documentary about the extent to which Arabs face slander and manipulation in Hollywood, commenting that he has formulated that view of his after having seen over a thousand films produced, in the past and in the present. He also talks about how bleak the views are, those of which are borne by the Western civilization (and he refers to it as our civilization), admittedly confessing how the views directly attack the Arabs' humanity. Furthermore, he mentions how the same image took shape in several patterns to feed the same substance that is continuously demonizing the Arabs, thus. The image had to repeat over and over and was depicted in scenes in several films that heavily abuse the Arabs' behaviors and morals.

All through the documentary, Shaheen's statements are illustrated by clips from the films he describes.

Shaheen reviews some of the images about Arabs he perceives as distorted, and argues this causes a process of feeding/poisoning the minds of the younger generations with these infected ideas about Arabs that characterizes them with such heinous and harmful descriptions as in the Disney motion picture, Aladdin. Shaheen also turns it around: what must viewers from the Arab world think of America and Americans when they keep seeing these images in American films?

Shaheen also argues that the image of the Arab woman is distorted and does not represent her. Arab women in films are either bellydancers or faceless, anonymous shapes in black robes. More recently Arab women are also portrayed as terrorists. The truth is, they are just like all other women in the world: talented, intelligent, and equal in all areas and fields.

Shaheen then argues that politics have a big role in affecting Hollywood's image about Arabs, and moreover, both Hollywood and politics feed and empower the other. He stresses that filmmakers openly acknowledge this interaction between Hollywood and American politics by citing Jack Valenti, longtime president of the Motion Picture Association of America: "Washington and Hollywood spring from the same DNA". Political and economic events like the crisis of high oil prices in the United States as a result of the Arabs refusal of exporting it to The States, the revolution in Iran (a non-Arab country) as well as Al-Qaeda activities, the events of 9/11 and others, all exported a bad, faded image about Arabs to every American home... It is a truly a very distorted picture. Both the book and the film to reveal the American film scene history, where they exposed a blatant pattern of profiling to stereotype the Arabs and they also showed the similarity of this stereotype with the racist, anti-Semitic caricature and cartoon art throughout history.

Alleging a political agenda, he says out of 1,000 films that have Arab and Muslim characters (from the year 1896 to 2000), 12 were positive depictions, 52 were neutral portrayals of Arabs, and 936 were negative.

Although the negative imagery of Arabs and the Arab world in the film is a hundred years old, Shaheen also voices optimism about the future. Showing some examples of films that portray Arabs as ordinary people, he expects the negative images to change, due to the works of a new generation of filmmakers, who see things differently.

Arabs stereotypes reportedly found in movies
 The bad Arab character that is always evil and portrayed as a "terrorist" causing explosions, shootings, stabbings, offenses and attacks.
 The shallow or silly Arab character that is always naive, pursuing only fun, lust, and extravagance.
 The Bedouin Arab character, that is remotely far from civilization and science and is often accompanied by "tent" and "camel" images.
 The arrogant Arab character that is very nervous, repressive of women, and the farthest possible from emotions or romance.

Films which reportedly depict these stereotypes include

The Sheik - 1921
A Son of the Sahara - 1924
The Thief of Bagdad - 1924
A Cafe in Cairo - 1924
The Son of the Sheik - 1926
The Desert Bride - 1928
Invitation to the Dance - 1956
Exodus - 1960
Harum Scarum - 1965
Cast a Giant Shadow - 1966
The Black Stallion - 1975
Network - 1976
The Happy Hooker Goes to Washington - 1977
Black Sunday - 1977
Chapter Two - 1979
Raiders of the Lost Ark - 1981
Rollover - 1981
Never Say Never Again - 1983
Sahara - 1983
Cannonball Run II - 1984
Protocol – 1984
Back to the Future – 1985
Young Sherlock Holmes - 1985
The Jewel of the Nile - 1985
Hell Squad - 1985
The Delta Force – 1986
Iron Eagle – 1986
Death Before Dishonor - 1987
Wanted: Dead or Alive - 1987
The Taking of Flight 847: The Uli Derickson Story – 1988
Indiana Jones and the Last Crusade - 1989
The Bonfire of the Vanities – 1990
Navy SEALs – 1990
Patriot Games - 1992
Aladdin - 1992
Son of the Pink Panther - 1993
Bloodfist VI: Ground Zero – 1994
True Lies – 1994
Father of the Bride Part II - 1995
Executive Decision - 1996
Ernest in the Army - 1998
The Siege - 1998
The Mummy - 1999
Rules of Engagement – 2000
Gladiator - 2000
Black Hawk Down - 2002
24 - TV series
Sleeper Cell - TV series

Films which reportedly depict a positive image include
Robin Hood: Prince of Thieves – 1991
A Perfect Murder - 1998
Hideous Kinky - 1998
The 13th Warrior – 1999
Three Kings – 1999
Kingdom of Heaven – 2005

Cast
Filmmaker information

Narrator: Jack Shaheen
Director: Sut Jhally
Producer: Jeremy Earp
Post-Production Supervisor: Andrew Killoy
Editors: Sut Jhally, Andrew Killoy, Mary Patierno
Additional Editing: Jeremy Smith
Sound Engineering: Peter Acker, Armadillo Audio Group
Media Research & Collection: Kenyon King, Bathsheba Ratzkoff
Subtitling: Jason Young
Arabic Translation: Huda Yehia, The Translation Center at the University of Massachusetts
Graphic Designer: Shannon McKenna
Additional Motion Graphics: Janet Brockelhurst
Production Assistant: Jason Young
DVD Authoring: Andrew Killoy, Jeremy Smith
Additional Footage Provided by: Mary Patierno, The Newsmarket.

Reception

Film festivals
The film festivals that showed the documentary are: 
Official Selection, 2009 Cinemateket, Norwegian Film Institute
Official Selection, 2009 Chicago Arabesque
Official Selection, 2009 Arab Film Festival, Calgary
Official Selection, 2008 Palestinian Film Festival, Sydney
Official Selection, 2008 Nazariya Films for PEACE Festival
Official Selection, 2008 One World Berlin Film Festival
Official Selection, 2008 Mostra Mundo Arabe de Cinema
Official Selection, 2008 Festival del integracion de Valencia
Official Selection, 2008 Our Island, Our World Film Film Festival
Official Selection, 2008 Adelaide Festival of Arts
Official Selection, 2007 Arabian Sights Film Festival
Official Selection, 2007 Arab Film Festival
Official Selection, 2007 Cinema East Film Festival
Official Selection, 2007 Date Palm Film Festival
Official Selection, 2007 Brisbane International Film Festival
Official Selection, 2007 Liverpool Arabic Arts Festival
Official Selection, 2007 National Conference for Media Reform
Official Selection, 2006 Dubai International Film Festival

See also
Reel Injun
Orientalism
Stereotypes of Arabs and Muslims in the United States

References

External links
 Reel Bad Arabs: How Hollywood Vilifies a People, documentary by Jack Shaheen, 2006
 
 Reel Bad Arabs on the Media Education Foundation
 Reel Bad Arabs: How Hollywood Vilifies a People. Text of interview with Jack Shaheen on Democracy Now!
Report - Dr. Jack Shaheen Discusses Reel Bad Arabs: How Hollywood Vilifies a People, By Richard H. Curtiss and Delinda C. Hanley, Washington Report on Middle East Affairs

2006 films
2006 documentary films
Anti-Arabism in North America
Documentary films about Hollywood, Los Angeles
Documentary films about racism in the cinema of the United States
Films about Islam
Films about racism
Films based on non-fiction books
Media coverage and representation
Arab-American literature
Stereotypes of Arab people
2000s English-language films